is an adult visual novel by Leaf originally released for DOS on January 26, 1996. It has since received releases for Windows. The sequel is To Heart, because in To Heart ~Remember My Memories~, Yūsuke and a deceased Mizuho appear. It is the first game to be marketed as a visual novel.

Characters

The game's protagonist.

A cheerful and talkative member of the volleyball team. She is an eyewitness to a certain event and is quickly swept up in the aftermath.

A former classmate of Yūsuke's. She can often be found reading books in a secluded area.

Yūsuke's classmate and vice-president of the student council.

The shy student council secretary with a hidden stubborn side. She has been best friends with Kanako since middle school.

Yūsuke's uncle and a teacher at the same school. He often provides useful advice in relation to the game's events.

References

External links
 

1996 video games
Bishōjo games
NEC PC-9801 games
Eroge
Japan-exclusive video games
Video games developed in Japan
Video games scored by Shinji Orito
Visual novels
Windows games
Leaf (Japanese company) games
Aquaplus games